Lake Brosno is a lake situated in the European part of Russia, in the Tver region, near the town of Andreapol. It is the place where the Brosno dragon is supposed to live. The lake's depth is about 43 meters (140 feet) at its deepest point, and it has a sunken church on the western part of it. Among the fish that inhabit the lake are perch and burbot.

References

Lakes of Tver Oblast